Samuel Johannesson (born 27 December 2000) is a Swedish professional ice hockey defenceman who plays currently plays for Brynäs IF in the Swedish Hockey League (SHL).  He was drafted by the Columbus Blue Jackets in the 6th round of the 2020 NHL Entry Draft with the 176th overall pick.

Johannesson made his SHL debut with Rögle BK in the 2018–19 season. Following the 2021–22 season, Johannesson left Rögle BK, signing a two-year contract with fellow SHL club, Brynäs IF, on 4 May 2022.

Career statistics

References

External links

2000 births
Living people
Brynäs IF players
Columbus Blue Jackets draft picks
Kristianstads IK players
Sportspeople from Halmstad
Rögle BK players
Swedish ice hockey defencemen
Sportspeople from Halland County